Dzhurmachi (Dargwa: Журмачи) is a rural locality (a selo) in Trisanchinsky Selsoviet, Dakhadayevsky District, Republic of Dagestan, Russia. The population was 155 as of 2010.

Geography 
Dzhurmachi is located 14 km southeast of Urkarakh (the district's administrative centre) by road. Daknisa and Dzhirabachi are the nearest rural localities.

Nationalities 
Dargins live there.

References 

Rural localities in Dakhadayevsky District